Serve or SERVE may refer to:

Sports
The act of placing a ball or other object in play in sports such as;
 Serve (pickleball)
 Serve (tennis)
 Serve (volleyball)

Other
 Service of process, to formally deliver legal documents
 Secure Electronic Registration and Voting Experiment
 SERVE Afghanistan, a UK-registered charity that works in Afghanistan

See also 
 Server (disambiguation)
 Service (disambiguation)
 Serving (disambiguation)